Rowe Glacier is an alpine glacier in Rocky Mountain National Park in the U.S. state of Colorado. Rowe Glacier was the first glacier to be identified in Colorado.

See also
List of glaciers in the United States

References

Glaciers of Rocky Mountain National Park
Landforms of Larimer County, Colorado